Coptoptera is a genus of beetles in the family Carabidae, containing the following species:

 Coptoptera angusticollis Boheman, 1848  
 Coptoptera apicalis (Peringuey, 1896) 
 Coptoptera brunnea Chaudoir, 1837 
 Coptoptera capicola Peringuey, 1896  
 Coptoptera johorensis Kirschenhofer, 2010 
 Coptoptera longicollis Basilewsky, 1956 
 Coptoptera malvernensis (Barker, 1919) 
 Coptoptera mersingensis Kirschenhofer, 2010 
 Coptoptera pugnax (Peringuey, 1896) 
 Coptoptera simplex (Peringuey, 1896)  
 Coptoptera zuluana Basilewsky, 1956

References

Lebiinae